Eagles and Prey is an outdoor bronze sculpture by Christophe Fratin, located in Central Park in Manhattan, New York. Created in 1850 and installed in Central Park in 1863, it is the earliest known sculpture to be installed in any New York City park.

References

External links

 

1850 establishments in New York (state)
1850 sculptures
Animal sculptures in New York City
Bronze sculptures in Central Park
Goats in art
Outdoor sculptures in Manhattan
Sculptures of birds in the United States
Statues in New York City